The Graduate School of Arts and Sciences (GSAS) at Brandeis University in Waltham, Massachusetts, United States was established in 1953 on a 235-acre suburban campus, located 9 miles outside of Boston, and is one of four graduate schools on campus.

Brandeis University, founded in 1948, is named for the late U.S. Supreme Court Justice Louis Dembitz Brandeis. Soon after its founding, Brandeis University established an international reputation through prominent early faculty members such as Eleanor Roosevelt and composer Leonard Bernstein, and through election to the Association of American Universities.

In the Graduate School of Arts and Sciences' first year (1953), 42 students were enrolled in four areas of study: chemistry, Near Eastern and Judaic Studies, music composition, and psychology. Today, Brandeis University's Graduate School of Arts and Sciences enrolls more than 900 students pursuing advanced degrees in more than 40 master's and certificate degrees and 17 doctoral programs.

Master's and Post-Baccalaureate Programs 
On average, master's students attend four semesters, but many programs may be completed in one year.  Support to students, both inside and outside the classroom, is available through the following: merit and need based scholarships; a one-year master's colloquium to develop basic graduate skills; master's research funding to sponsor research for master's theses; travel funds to attend scholarly conferences; and career services for professional development. Professional and predoctoral programs are also offered to enhance one's skills in the social sciences, humanities, arts, education, natural sciences, and physical sciences. The emphases on small classes and faculty mentorship allow students to work closely with senior scholars.

 Postbaccalaureate programs are also offered.

Doctoral programs 
The doctoral degree is often a requirement for most academic positions in higher education, but it also enhances one's qualifications for nonacademic careers in public and private organizations—from service in the federal government to the private sector.  Brandeis University's doctoral programs emphasize research, writing, and public speaking—skills that are critical for every career path.

Most doctoral students are funded fully for five years.

Boston Consortium
Brandeis University, Boston College, Boston University and Tufts University participate in a cross-registration consortium. A full-time graduate student in the Graduate School of Arts and Sciences may enroll in one graduate cross-registered course each term.

Facilities

Carl J. Shapiro Science Center
The Carl J. Shapiro Science Center complex, which opened in January 2009, is a five-story teaching and research-laboratory building which contains modern teaching and research spaces for biochemistry, biology, chemistry, and genomics.  The Shapiro Science Center houses the National Center of Behavioral Genomics, which is dedicated to understanding brain function and behavior. Current research focuses on degenerative neurological diseases, autism, learning, and memory.

Within the complex itself, key goals are to create research and teaching-lab/classroom spaces appropriate for the research and teaching that characterize science at Brandeis University and to foster connections between disciplines in the sciences through physical connections and the creation of interaction spaces.

FEATURES:

•High-efficiency glass and exterior sunshades on the south facade achieve optimized control of solar heat gain. The air systems operate at various levels of intensity to conserve energy when the building isn’t fully occupied. The lighting system includes both occupancy sensors and a daylight harvesting system that automatically dims or brightens the lights in a room based on the amount of daylight. The building also has two heat-recovery wheels that draw heat out of the air to help cool the space in the summer and warm it in the winter.
•More than 95 percent of construction and demolition waste was recycled. All salvageable furniture removed from vacant spaces either was reused at Brandeis or donated for reuse elsewhere. Recycling containers are provided in every kitchen, lab, office, and common space to support the Brandeis recycling program.
•Large amounts of glass on the exterior of the building provide ample daylight. All interior spaces have direct or borrowed daylight (except where research requires darkness). Operable windows in nonlab spaces offer occupants natural ventilation. 
•Native plantings require no irrigation or maintenance, significantly reducing water consumption. Concrete sidewalks contain a white additive to help reflect sunlight and reduce solar heat gain. Permeable eco-pavers allow water to soak into the ground, and underground retention tanks store rainwater for slow release.
•The flooring tile, carpet, and exterior panels are all made with recycled and recyclable material. Furniture is GREENGUARD-certified. Wood used throughout the project is free of formaldehyde. 
•Research labs are designed for maximum flexibility. Open labs along the north and south faces of the building can expand and contract, while a flexible casework system can be easily adjusted as lab requirements change.

Mandel Center for Humanities
Made possible by a $22.5 million gift from the Cleveland-based Mandel Foundation, the Mandel Center for Humanities bolsters Brandeis University’s commitment to the humanities and social sciences, and underscores the cultural and intellectual importance of the liberal arts education and the fields of literature, language, and philosophy.

Opened in fall 2010, the Mandel Center's mission is to foster original, interdisciplinary courses and offer increased opportunities for students to participate in research that incorporates multifaceted subject matter. The center also organizes special local, national, and international conferences and events.

Other Research Facilities
Brandeis faculty have also secured external funding for an array of other research facilities. These include:

 An 800 MHz nuclear magnetic resonance spectrometer
 An electron microscopy (EM) facility, including a 300kV field emission cryo EM
 A Fourier transform mass spectrometry facility, equipped for both electrospray and MALDI ionization
 X-ray crystallography facilities
 Microfluidics fabrication facility
 The Ashton Graybiel Spatial Orientation Laboratory
 The Mandel Center for the Humanities
 The Irving Schneider and Family Building
 CLEM-Facility for Correlative Light and Electron Microscopy

Distinguished Faculty and Alumni

Faculty
Pulitzer Prize Winners:

David Hackett Fischer-History

Eileen McNamara-American Studies/Journalism

Yehudi Wyner-Music (emeritus)

National Academy of Sciences members:

Carolyn Cohen-Biology

David DeRosier-Biology (emeritus)

Stanley Deser-Physics (emeritus)

Jeffrey C. Hall-Biology/Neuroscience (emeritus)

Hugh Huxley-Biology (emeritus)

Eve Marder-Biology/Neuroscience

Chris Miller-Biochemistry/Neuroscience

Greg Petsko-Biochemistry/Chemistry (Institute of Medicine)

Alfred Redfield-Physics (emeritus)

Michael Rosbash-Biology/Neuroscience

American Academy of Arts and Sciences:

Edgar Brown-Mathematics (emeritus)

David Buchsbaum-Mathematics (emeritus)

Carolyn Cohen-Biology

Saul Cohen-Chemistry (emeritus)

David DeRosier-Biology (emeritus)

Stanley Deser-Physics (emeritus)

David Hackett Fischer-History

James Haber-Biology

Jeff Hall-Biology/Neuroscience (emeritus)

Ray Jackendoff-Language and Linguistics/Psychology (emeritus)

Gish Jen-English and American Literature

Mickey Keller-History

Henry Linschitz-Chemistry

Eve Marder-Biology/Neuroscience

Irene Pepperberg-Psychology

Greg Petsko-Biochemistry/Chemistry

Alfred Redfield-Physics (emeritus)

Jehuda Reinharz-Near Eastern Judaic Studies

Michael Rosbash-Biology/Neuroscience

Jonathan Sarna-Cultural Production/Near Eastern Judaic Studies

Sam Schweber-Physics (emeritus)

Andrew Szent-Györgyi-Biology (emeritus)

Howard Hughes Medical Investigators:

Nikolaus Grigorieff-Biochemistry

Dorothee Kern-Biochemistry/Biological Physics

Chris Miller-Biochemistry/Neuroscience

Michael Rosbash-Biology/Neuroscience

MacArthur Fellows:

Bernadette Brooten-Medieval and Renaissance Studies/Near Eastern and Judaic Studies/Women and
Gender Studies

Gina G. Turrigiano-Biology/Neuroscience

See More

Alumni
Jason Carmichael (Genetic Counseling, M.S. '08) Accepted to Schweitzer Fellows Program

Ha Jin (PhD '93) Poet and fiction writer whose work includes Waiting (winner of the National Book Award) and, most recently, A Free Life.

Paul Anastas (PhD '90) Nominated by President Obama to the post of Assistant Administrator of the Environmental Protection Agency's Research and Development Office.

Theresa Rebeck (M.A.'83, MFA '86, PhD '89) Playwright, made her Broadway debut in October with "Mauritius."

Raymond Arsenault (History, PhD '81) Professor and writer, best known for his book, Freedom Riders.

References

External links
 Official Web Site
 Boston Consortium for Higher Education 
 Virtual Tour of Shapiro Science Center

Brandeis University
Educational institutions established in 1953
University subdivisions in Massachusetts
1953 establishments in Massachusetts